The threadfin cichlid (Petrochromis trewavasae) is a species of cichlid endemic to Lake Tanganyika found in areas with rocky substrates on which it can graze on algae. It can be found in the aquarium trade. The specific name of this cichlid honours the British ichthyologist Ethelwynn Trewavas (1900-1993).

See also
List of freshwater aquarium fish species

References

Threadfin cichlid
Taxa named by Max Poll
Fish described in 1948
Taxonomy articles created by Polbot